Nancy Tang is the name of:

Tang Wensheng (born 1943), US-born Chinese diplomat
Nancy T. Chang (born 1950), Taiwanese-American biochemist